Akenie Adams (born 5 February 1998) is a Guyanese cricketer. He made his first-class debut for Guyana in the 2016–17 Regional Four Day Competition on 21 April 2017.

Adams' brother, Anthony Adams is also a cricketer and both play for the Essequibo, right-handed, bowling left-arm orthodox. Adams grew up in Suddie, playing cricket in his neighborhood along with his 5 siblings (including Anthony). He was encouraged to join a club and so took up with Santos Sports Club. Adams was a part of the under-15 Guyana team, then the under-19.

Adams credits his brother as his inspiration, in an interview saying that his favorite memory of playing alongside his brother was "the 2016 Busta 40-over final where they added 85 for the seventh wicket for South Essequibo against East Bank Essequibo"

References

External links
 

1998 births
Living people
Guyanese cricketers
Guyana cricketers
Place of birth missing (living people)